The Macmillan River is a tributary, approximately  long, of the Pelly River in the Yukon Territory of northwestern Canada. It originates in the Mackenzie Mountains and flows in a generally westward direction.

References

Rivers of Yukon
Tributaries of the Yukon River